The Water Nymph (Rusalka) is a 1910 Russian short film directed by Vasili Goncharov.

Plot 

The film is based on the play The Water Nymph by Alexander Pushkin.

Starring 
 Vasili Stepanov as The Miller
 Aleksandra Goncharova as Natalya, His Daughter
 Andrey Gromov as The Prince

References

External links 
 

1910 films
1910s Russian-language films
Russian silent short films
1910 short films
Russian black-and-white films
Films directed by Vasily Goncharov
Films of the Russian Empire